The Best is Yet to Come was a film distributed by exploitation film presenter Kroger Babb in 1951. Babb promoted the film as "all there is to know about cancer".

Plot

Cast

References

 New York Times: Specialist. 18 March 1951.
 John Waters, "My Kind of Guy" (URL accessed 16 October 2006).
 Mike Quarles: Down and Dirty: Hollywood's Exploitation Filmmakers and Their Movies.  McFarland & Company, 2001.

1951 films
1951 drama films
American drama films
1950s English-language films
1950s American films